An indirect election for the position of President of the Hellenic Republic was held by the Hellenic Parliament in 1995.

In the parliament resulting from the 1993 elections, PASOK held the majority with 170 seats, followed by New Democracy with 111 seats and the Political Spring party (founded by breakaway ND politician Antonis Samaras) held 10 seats.

Conservative politician Konstantinos Stephanopoulos was proposed by Political Spring as successor of Konstantinos Karamanlis, who was finishing his second (non-consecutive) term, and was also supported by the ruling PASOK. New Democracy proposed veteran politician  as its candidate. Three ballots were required for the election, which all had almost the same result: 181 votes for Stephanopoulos (the MPs of PASOK and Political Spring) and 109 (108 in the second ballot) for Tsaldaris (all but one of ND's MPs). The Communist Party of Greece and one ND MP voted "present".

Stephanopoulos would go on to be re-elected in 2000 as a joint candidate of ND and PASOK, the first time in the history of the Third Hellenic Republic that the ruling party and the main opposition party both supported the same candidate, as well as the first time that an incumbent President was re-elected.

References

1995
1995 elections in Greece
1990s in Greek politics